Worton is a hamlet in Wensleydale in the Yorkshire Dales in the Richmondshire district of North Yorkshire, England. The hamlet is just south of the River Ure, the biggest river in Wensleydale. The hamlet is named in the Domesday Book and its name derives from the Old English wyrt-tūn and means the (herb or vegetable) garden.

There are a number of listed buildings in the hamlet, including Worton Hall and the Victoria Arms public house who had one of the longest serving landlords in British pub history. Ralph Daykin was the publican at the Victoria Arms between 1956 and 2013.

References

External links

Map of the hamlet

Villages in North Yorkshire
Wensleydale